Return to Babylon is a 2013 black-and-white silent film about the silent film era. It was directed by Alex Monty Canawati. It stars an ensemble cast of Jennifer Tilly, María Conchita Alonso, Ione Skye, Debi Mazar, Laura Harring, and Tippi Hedren.

Premise
Photographed with a hand-cranked camera and scored with music of the roaring twenties, this silent film strings together the lives of the most famous and infamous stars of the 1920s, including Rudolph Valentino, Gloria Swanson, Clara Bow, Lupe Vélez, Fatty Arbuckle, and William Desmond Taylor.

Cast

Jennifer Tilly as Clara Bow
María Conchita Alonso as Lupe Vélez
Ione Skye as Virginia Rappe
Debi Mazar as Gloria Swanson
Tippi Hedren as Mrs. Peabody
Rolonda Watts as Josephine Baker
Laura Harring as Alla Nazimova
Morganne Picard as Mabel Normand
Brett Ashy as Fatty Arbuckle
Paul Kent as Mack Sennett
Michael Goldman as Adolph Zukor
Stephen Saux as Mr. Producer
Marina Bakica as Alma Rubens
Jack Atlantis as William Desmond Taylor
Wendy Caron as Barbara La Marr
Phillip Bloch as Ramon Novarro
Robert Sherman as Erich von Stroheim
Devora Lillian as Mary Miles Minter
Maxwell DeMille as Douglas Fairbanks
Alex Monty Canawati as Rudolph Valentino
Adnan Taletovich as John Gilbert
Jennifer Seifert as Pola Negri

Background
Return to Babylon features locations in and around Hollywood, California, including the original home of Rudolph Valentino, Falcon Lair, as well as the Norma Talmadge estate, the Canfield-Moreno Estate, and the Magic Castle in the Hollywood Hills.

The feature was shot using 19 rolls of 16mm film supposedly found sitting on a sidewalk on Hollywood Boulevard in Hollywood, California.

Reports of paranormal activity
The film's marketing played up the notion that the film was haunted. Media releases and interviews stated that the actors faces can be seen "morphing" into grotesque shapes in certain shots. There were reports of actors having elongated and webbed fingers, full bodied apparitions, seeing the faces of dead actors (such as Lon Chaney) manifest in shots, and shadows resembling demons or skeletons. Many of the cast and crew had confirmed many of these reports and stated they experienced odd events during production, with Jennifer Tilly in particular describing feeling "watched" and "touched" by unseen forces during filming.

Release
The film was released on 11 August 2013 in the United States. It was re-released on 15 January 2019 on YouTube after years of not finding home video distribution.

References

External links
 
 

American black-and-white films
American silent feature films
American comedy-drama films
American independent films
2013 comedy-drama films
2013 films
Films about actors
Cultural depictions of Josephine Baker
Cultural depictions of Rudolph Valentino
Cultural depictions of actors
Films set in the 1920s
2010s English-language films
2010s American films
Silent comedy-drama films
Silent American drama films
Silent American comedy films